Provincial elections were held in the Pakistani province of Balochistan on 11 May 2013, alongside nationwide general elections and three other provincial elections in Sindh, Khyber Pakhtunkhwa and Punjab. The remaining two territories of Pakistan, Azad Kashmir and Gilgit-Baltistan, were ineligible to vote due to their disputed status.

Background
The 2013 elections resulted in a hung parliament, before Pakistan Muslim League (N), National Party, and Pashtunkhwa Milli Awami Party joined hands to form a coalition government. A power-sharing agreement was also brokered between PML-N and NP where the province's Chief Ministership tenure would be bifurcated between the two parties. In consequence, NP's Abdul Malik Baloch served as chief minister from 2013 to 2015 before he was replaced by PML-N's Sanaullah Khan Zehri at the end of 2015.

However, Zehri couldn't complete his term as on 2 January 2018, a number of dissident members from the ruling PML-N colluded with opposition lawmakers to submit a no-confidence motion against him. Seeing that he has lost the majority of the house's support in the ensuing turmoil, Zehri resigned from his post before a no-confidence vote could take place. Pakistan Muslim League (Q)'s, Abdul Quddus Bizenjo, an opposition lawmaker and one of the leaders of the no-confidence bloc, was elected as the province's 15th Chief Minister. He secured 41 of the 65 votes.

Results

References

2013 elections in Pakistan
Elections in Balochistan